Queen of Fables is a supervillain who has battled the Justice League, Wonder Woman and Superman. Based on the character of the Evil Queen from "Snow White", the Queen of Fables is the living embodiment of all evil in folklore. She first appeared in JLA #47 (November 2000), and was created by Gail Simone, Mark Waid and Bryan Hitch.

Fictional character biography
The Queen of Fables was originally a sorceress from another dimension until she was exiled to Earth. She reigned until princess Snow White defied her and she was trapped in the Book of Fables. Snow White used the book to turn fact into fiction and undo all the Queen's terrible acts.

Countless generations later the Queen was unwittingly released from her prison. She transformed Manhattan into an enchanted forest full of fantastic creatures extracted from folk tales. Just after being released she attempted to locate Snow White, mistaking a television for a magic mirror, and ordered it to show her -"The Fairest In The Land". Coincidentally, the TV was currently showing the news, reporting the Justice League's latest battle, and at that moment showing Wonder Woman. Believing the Amazon Princess to be her daughter, she confronts her, forcing her into a deep sleep in an enchanted forest. Aquaman awakens Wonder Woman with his kiss (as he was once a Prince, and is now the King of Atlantis, it counts as a kiss from a Prince), and Batman discovers the book that the Queen had been trapped in. Eventually, the Justice League managed to stop her, by making her realize that she was no longer immortal and eternally beautiful in the real world, and lock her up once more (by trapping her within a book on the United States Tax Code, where she could find nothing imaginative to use as a weapon), undoing her spell again.

Eventually the Queen of Fables awakens and is none too happy. Since being defeated by the Justice League, who placed her in the U.S. Tax Code manual, she has somehow escaped and now has her sights set on her own Prince Charming, Superman. After transporting Superman to a Kryptonian glass forest, he is able to win his freedom and defeat the Queen (although the effort leaves him weak). She is last seen standing over a young sleeping girl, saying "Sleep well, dear one. Keep me alive. Dream of me. Dream of me".

She returns again after assuming the identity of Laney Kirswel, the film executive in charge of an unauthorized Wonder Woman biography, made mostly of unapproved and slandering materials. She is again able to act in the human world, where she puts Wonder Woman through hellish scenarios, taken from the movie, meant to represent distorted happenings in her life. Diana coaxes her into taking the form of a huge dragon, who she notes is reminiscent of Maleficent, and blinds her with two battle axes, forcing her to flee.

Powers and abilities
The Queen of Fables is an extremely powerful sorceress and was able to transform Manhattan into an enchanted forest. She can perform virtually any feat and usually has fairy tale creatures such as dragons, ogres and goblins at her command. The Queen of Fables has the ability to conjure various fictional monsters from other stories to use against the Justice League. She is immortal and cannot be killed while she resides within her storybook.

In other media

Television
Queen of Fables appears in the DC Universe animated series Harley Quinn, voiced by Wanda Sykes. This version's powers are derived from a magical storybook from which she can conjure storybook characters to do her bidding. Introduced in "So, You Need a Crew?", she attempted to break the glass ceiling for female supervillains in the 1980s by turning Gotham into an enchanted forest kingdom with an army of storybook characters. However, she was defeated by the Justice League and transformed into a talking U.S. Master Tax Guide Book by Zatanna, leaving the Queen annoyed about not being thrown in Arkham Asylum "like any male villain". Following this, she gained a job as a tax consultant. In "The Line", she is freed from the tax code by a court order that deemed it to be a cruel and unusual punishment, though she is ironically sentenced to serve the rest of her term at Arkham. Harley Quinn breaks her out in transit and the Queen temporarily joins her crew before her extreme and violent methods lead to her being ousted. After the crew steals a weather control device to ransom Gotham, the Queen attempts to steal it for herself, but they are interrupted by Jason Praxis, a surviving member of a family she had slaughtered with electrical powers who sought revenge on the Queen. He destroys her storybook, but Harley uses a force field device she and her crew previously stole to protect the Queen and subdue Praxis before getting the former to leave. Killing Praxis on her way out, the Queen promises Harley will regret letting her live. In the episode "Devil's Snare", having formed an alliance with the Joker and acquired a new storybook, the Queen traps the Justice League in it before sending Harley and her crew up a beanstalk to be killed by a giant cyclops. After getting down with Kite Man's help, Harley kills the Queen. As of "A Fight Worth Fighting For", the Book of Fables fell into the possession of a nurse named Bethany after Joker was rendered sane and gave it to her. Once a restored Joker retrieved it for Harley, Batman has Zatanna free the Justice League from it. The Queen later appears during an in memoriam segment during a villain's award show in season 3.

Video games 
Queen of Fables appears as a summonable character in Scribblenauts Unmasked: A DC Comics Adventure.

Miscellaneous
 Queen of Fables appears in Batman: The Brave and the Bold issue #5 "The Case of the Fractured Fairy Tale". She abducts children so she can use their tears to keep herself young and beautiful, but runs afoul of Batman and Captain Marvel. While she transforms Captain Marvel into a dragon minion, Batman steals the storybook and tricks the dragon into destroying it, causing the Queen to melt and undo her spells.
 Queen of Fables appears in DC Super Friends issue #21 "Happily Never After". When the Queen's storybook suddenly appears in their Watchtower, the Super Friends open it out of curiosity, but it pulls them into a fairy tale realm where the Queen invites them to become her subjects. When they decline, she scatters them throughout her realm, where they run into various fairy tale characters. The Super Friends eventually regroup, giving the characters happier endings in the process, before confronting the Queen to send them back. She threatens them with several monsters, but the Super Friends realize that they can influence the story with their imaginations. While the Queen uses this ability to undo their changes, Green Lantern forces the story to end by saying, "And they lived happily ever after. The End", returning the Super Friends to the Watchtower, where they lock the storybook away in their trophy room.

References

External links
 Queen of Fables Rapsheet
 Queen of Fables at DC Database
 Queen of Fables at Writeups.org
 Queen of Fables at Comic Vine

Characters created by Bryan Hitch
Characters created by Gail Simone
Characters created by Mark Waid
Comics characters introduced in 2000
DC Comics deities
DC Comics female supervillains
DC Comics witches 
DC Comics characters who are shapeshifters
DC Comics characters who can teleport
DC Comics characters who use magic 
Fictional characters who can manipulate reality
Fictional characters with energy-manipulation abilities
Fictional characters with immortality
Fictional empaths
Evil Queen